We Are Your Friends is the second album by Simian. It was released on 28 October 2002 on Mawlaw 388 in the UK and on 29 October 2002 on Astralwerks.

Track listing 

"La Breeze" – 	2:56
"Sunshine" – 3:15
"Never Be Alone" – 3:22
"Helpless" – 3:29
"Skin" – 3:01
"Big Black Gun" – 3:15
"In Between" – 3:11
"The Way I Live" – 3:19
"The Swarm" – 3:39
"When I Go" – 3:10
"She's In Mind" – 3:50
"End Of The Day" – 4:09

Personnel

Simian
Simon William Lord - vocals, guitar, keyboards, drum programming
Alex MacNaghten - bass, backing vocals
James Anthony Shaw -  keyboards, drum programming, percussion
James Ford - drums, drum programming, percussion

Other personnel
 Mat Maitland - design, art direction 
 Kate Gibb - artwork (silkscreens)
 Peter Edwards - photography
 Donald Milne - photography

References

External links

2002 albums
Simian (band) albums